Eldred Jewell (December 15, 1892 – December 20, 1960) was an American-born Canadian professional ice hockey player. He played with the Vancouver Millionaires of the Pacific Coast Hockey Association.

References

1890s births
1941 deaths
American expatriates in Canada
Canadian ice hockey right wingers
Ice hockey people from British Columbia
People from Rossland, British Columbia
Vancouver Millionaires players